Abbé François Joseph Fettig (10 July 1824, Mothern near Wissembourg – 5 May 1906, Matzenheim)
was a French entomologist specialising in Lepidoptera and Coleoptera.

His collections are shared between Muséum national d'histoire naturelle (Coleoptera), Museum Colmar (Microlepidoptera and larvae, destroyed or badly damaged) and Zoological Museum, Strasbourg (Macrolepidoptera).

Works
partial list
Catalogue des Lépidopteres d'Alsace avec indications des localités, de l'époque d'apparition et de quelques détails propres à en faciliter la recherche. I. Macrolépidopteres revue et coordonnée par M. le Dr. Macker. II. Microlépidopteres revue et coordonnée par M. l'Abbé Fettig.

References
Marchal, P. 1906: [Fettig, F. J.] Bulletin de la Société Entomologique de France, Paris
Constantin, R. 1992: Mémorial des Coléopteristes Français. Bulletin de liaison de l'Association des Coléoptéristes de la région parisienne, Paris (Suppl. 14), S. 1–92
Reiber, F. 1885: Aperçu des progrès de l'entomologie en Alsace, et notes sur les collections et les collectionneurs d'insectes de cette province, suivis d'une notice sur le Phylloxera en Alsace-Lorraine. Bulletin de la Société d'Histoire Naturelle de Colmar., Colmar 24–26, S. 505–554

French lepidopterists
1822 births
1902 deaths
19th-century French zoologists
20th-century French zoologists
People from Wissembourg